Abba Avraham Shmuel Twersky (1872–1947), known as Shmuel Abba Twersky, was a Rebbe of the Makarover Hasidic dynasty. He succeeded his father as Makarover Rebbe of Berdichev, Ukraine, in 1920, and presided as Makarover Rebbe of Winnipeg, Manitoba, Canada, from 1927 to 1947.

Early life and family
Shmuel Abba Twersky was born to Grand Rabbi Moshe Mordechai Twersky (1844–1920), a direct descendant of the Chernobyl Hasidic dynasty, who was the Makarover Rebbe of Berdichev and Kiev. His mother Chavah was a daughter of Yehoshua Rokeach, the second Belzer Rebbe. Shmuel Abba married his first cousin, Rickel Twersky, the daughter of his father's brother, David Twersky of Kiev. They had one son and one daughter. As a young married man, he was known for his proficiency in Torah study.

Upon his father's death in 1920, he and his brother Tzvi Aryeh ( 1938) became Makarover Rebbes in Berdichev. Later he briefly moved his court to Mezerich. In the wake of pogroms during the 1917–1921 Ukrainian War of Independence, he and his family fled to Riga, Latvia.

Canada
The Makarover Hasidic community in Winnipeg, Manitoba, Canada, included numerous members who had immigrated there due to the Ukrainian pogroms. They invited Twersky to be their leader. Twersky's move was stalled by two years of bureaucratic red tape. Finally he was cleared for immigration and departed by ship from Cherbourg, France, in December 1927. According to an article in the local Yiddish newspaper, he was greeted at the Winnipeg train station by "several hundred Hasidim". 

His community bought him a house on Flora Avenue, where a large number of Jewish immigrants resided. Later he moved to Boyd Avenue, where he opened a beth midrash in his house.

Twersky was a prominent leader of the Winnipeg Jewish community. However, he distanced himself from community discord and in-fighting.

On June 12th 2022 a group of belz Hasidim organized an overnight stay in Winnipeg with the help of Rabbi Altein of chabad Winnipeg in order to pray for the Holy Spirit of the tzadik Rabbi Shmiel aba twersky after many decades that people have not been to his holy grave and to say kadish for the Rabbi in form of a minyan.,

May the holy tzadik Rest In Peace and be mashpia and makir tov to them and to all of yisroel.

Personal life
Twersky's wife and two children joined him over two years after his arrival in Winnipeg. His wife died suddenly in February 1930 at the age of 54. Twersky's son Yitzchak Yaakov became principal of a Talmud Torah in Halifax, Nova Scotia; Twersky also had a daughter, Tzipporah.

Twersky died on 2 June 1947 (14 Sivan 5707). He was buried in an ohel in the Shaarey Zedek Cemetery in Winnipeg beside his wife. Many people came to pray at his ohel in the years after his death.

Notes

References

Sources

1872 births
1947 deaths
Hasidic rebbes
Canadian Orthodox rabbis
20th-century Russian rabbis
Canadian people of Ukrainian-Jewish descent
People from Berdychiv
People from Winnipeg
20th-century Canadian rabbis